The Mines and Work Act was a piece of legislation in South Africa, originally passed in 1911, amended in 1912 and 1926 before undergoing further changes in 1956 and 1959. This act legally established South Africa's employment "colour bar." and was enacted to establish the duties and responsibilities of workers in Mines and Works in South Africa.

Colour Bar Act Reference
This act (with/without/or its amendments) is sometimes referred to as the COLOUR BAR or the COLOUR BAR ACT. The term colour bar, however, usually refers to a group of labor practices, informal trade union practices, government regulations, and legislation, all of which were developed over time to prevent blacks from competing for certain categories of jobs monopolized by whites.

Original 1911 Act
At any rate, this act included various regulations which gave "white workers a monopoly of skilled operations". However, The Act did not specify that blacks should be discriminated against in any way. Indeed, it made no mention of race or colour. Nor did it specifically and clearly give the government Mining Engineer powers to introduce a legal colour bar. But under section 4(n) it gave the Governor-General powers to grant, cancel and suspend certificates of competency to mine managers, mine overseers, mine surveyors, mechanical engineers, engine-drivers and miners entitled to blast. It also gave him the power to decide which other occupations should be required to possess certificates of competency.

MINES & WORKS REGULATIONS ACT of 1912
Some or other commission had criticized mine managements for employing large numbers of unskilled whites 'often entirely ignorant of mining, and whose principal and often only recommendation is their physical fitness and their suitability for rough work'. Yet when the commission reported in 1910, it submitted draft regulations that were heavy with colour bars. Some appeared in the interpretation of terms, as when the words 'white person' were inserted in the definition of banksman, onsetter, ganger and mine manager. Some took the form of an injunction to employ only whites in specified occupations, such as blasting, running elevators, driving engines, supervising boilers and other machinery; or as shift boss and mine overseer. Furthermore, only whites would be allowed to obtain the certificates of competence required, for instance, by engine drivers and boiler attendants. With some modifications, these draft regulations served as model for the MINES & WORKS REGULATIONS ACT of 1912.

MINES & WORKS AMENDMENT ACT of 1926
In contrast to the 1912 REGULATIONS, this Act bracketed Coloured with whites in a position of privilege. For there was no question of segregating the coloured who spoke the Afrikaner's language, shared his outlook and stood closer to one than to the black population. Furthermore, the key section of this act "stated that the minister, before announcing regulations for issuing certificates of competency (including the key blasting certificate, for nearly a century of license of the white miner), should seek the advice of the owners and of the organizations whose members hold a majority of the certificates, that is, the white unions, including the Mine Worker's Union. He was to do this through the formation of advisory committees." This act was further revised in 1956 to deal with the declaration of work in the national interest.

See also
 :Category:Apartheid laws in South Africa
 Apartheid in South Africa

References

External links
 African History: Apartheid Legislation in South Africa
 https://omalley.nelsonmandela.org/omalley/index.php/site/q/03lv01538/04lv01646/05lv01736.html

Mining law and governance
Apartheid laws in South Africa
1911 in South African law